Bushra Zaidi was a 20-year-old girl whose death in a traffic accident on April 15, 1985 started riots in Karachi, Sindh, Pakistan. Bushra, a 20-year-old Muhajir student of Sir Syed College, died after being struck by a bus driver. It was thought at the time that the driver was Pashtun.

Background

Death
On 15 April 1985 a bus accident in the Nazimabad area led to the death of a Mohajir girl, a college student named Bushra Zaidi. The reckless driver, who was caught and pursued in the courts, was a Pashtun.

Aftermath

References

External links
 The city of sorrow

1965 births
1985 deaths
People from Karachi
Muhajir people
Pakistani Shia Muslims
Muhajir history
Deaths by person in Pakistan